Relations between the Commonwealth of Australia and the European Union (EU) are founded on a Partnership Framework, first agreed in 2008. It covers not just economic relations, but broader political issues and cooperation.

The Australian Government maintains a delegation to the EU at its embassy in Brussels. A Delegation of the European Union is located in Canberra.

History 
Australia's relationship with Europe is a result of the historical connections generated by colonialism and mass European immigration to Australia. Possible first sightings of mainland Australia by Portugal and Spain have been theorized. However, the first documented European landings occurred since March 1606 by Holland. Australia would later be explored and conquered between the 18th and 19th centuries by the British Empire.

Trade

The EU is Australia's second largest trading partner, after China, and Australia is the EU's 18th. Australia's exports are dominated by mineral and agricultural goods, while 37% of trade is in commercial services, especially transportation and travel. EU corporations have a strong presence in Australia (approximately 2360) with an estimated turnover of €200 bn (just over 14% of total sales in Australia). These companies directly created 500,000 jobs  in Australia.  The EU is Australia's second largest destination of overseas investment and the EU is by far Australia's largest source of foreign investment €2.8 billion in 2009 (€11.6 billion in 2008). Trade was growing but ebbed in 2009 due to the global financial crisis.
In August 2019, Australian Senator Simon Birmingham, released a list of names that the EU wants to protect as a part of its new trade deal. The list of proposed names included beers, spirits and cheese and meats, which as per EU is aimed at protecting the identity of European products from non-European products. This concept of segregation is known as “geographical indications” or Gis, which will change the name of commodity in regards to the country of its origin.

See also

 Foreign relations of Australia
 Foreign relations of the European Union

References

External links
 Australian mission to the EU
 EU mission to Australia
 European Union - Australian Department for Foreign Affairs and Trade
 

 
European Union
Third-country relations of the European Union